The Nepalese snowtrout (Schizothorax macrophthalmus) is a cyprinid fish species of the genus Schizothorax. This snowtrout was first collected in 1979 in the alpine fresh water Rara Lake located in Nepal's Rara National Park.

References

Schizothorax
Fish described in 1984